Albina Fernandes was an active member of the Portuguese Communist Party and a political prisoner during the Estado Novo era.

Early life
Albina Fernandes was born on 5 January 1928 in Soissons, France. Her parents were communists, at a constant risk of being arrested during World War II. After the war, Fernandes moved to Portugal, where she joined the Portuguese Communist Party. She married Alcino de Sousa Ferreira in 1948 and from 1949, when he became an official of the Communist Party, they led a clandestine existence until he was arrested in February 1951.

Living clandestinely
Using the pseudonym, Rosália, Fernandes lived in several clandestine houses over the next decade until she, too, was arrested in December 1961 at the same time as her then partner, Octávio Pato, who, after the defeat of the Estado Novo, would be the Portuguese Communist Party's candidate for president. Without having anyone with whom to leave their children, she took them with her to her cell at Caxias prison, the political prison close to Lisbon. When the guards threatened to remove Isabel (6-year-old daughter of Pato and Antónia Joaquina Monteiro) and Rui (2-year-old son of Fernandes and Pato) to an institution, on the grounds that Fernandes and Pato were not officially married, Fernandes made such an argument that they finally agreed that the children could be collected by Pato's parents. After a month in cells the children were finally released to their grandparents on 10 January 1962.

Imprisonment
Fernandes was tried on 17 November 1962, the same day that Pato was also tried at Peniche Fortress, and formally sent to prison. Fernandes was sentenced to prison for three years and banned from taking part in any political activity for the following 15 years. She ended up staying 6 years and 7 months in Caxias prison. During that time, she experienced considerable physical and psychological torture at the hands of the Estado Novo's PIDE (Polícia Internacional e de Defesa do Estado)). In November 1966, a petition requesting her release was signed by many people on the grounds that she had already served the sentence she had been given, and that her state of health was poor. Parole was only granted on 9 July 1968, and she was released two days later.

Death
On her release Fernandes campaigned for the release of Pato, without success. With her nervous system extremely weakened by the years of imprisonment, she committed suicide on October 2, 1970. The event was denounced by the National Commission for Relief to Political Prisoners (CNSPP). Its members, including Maria Eugénia Varela Gomes and Sophia de Mello Breyner Andresen, held the Government directly responsible for the "tragic event, a consequence that is not only the result of a long period in prison suffering inhumane conditions but also the cruel uncertainty regarding the situation of her husband", whose sentence in Peniche had been arbitrarily extended.

References

 Portuguese communists
Suicides in Portugal
Portuguese anti-fascists
Portuguese prisoners and detainees
1928 births
1970 suicides
1970 deaths